The Dimitrie Sturdza House (Romanian: Casa Dimitrie Sturdza) is a house with historical value, located in Bucharest, Romania, on Arthur Verona Street, no. 13-15. The house belonged to Dimitrie Sturdza (1833-1914), historian, economist, Romanian Academy member and the prime minister of Romania. Since 2003, it houses the bookshop Cărturești Verona, awarded as the Bookshop of the Year at London Book Fair International Excellence Awards 2021.

Description 
Built to a plan typical of mid-19th century wealthy residences, with a central hall and rooms laid out symmetrically. Its ceilings and door frames still preserve the original decorations. The facades are Neoclassical, while the interiors of the house are Eclectic. Some of the ornaments are Renaissance Revival. Many doors of the house are double and painted with arabesques. In the right half of the house are two white stoves.

The house is listed as a historic monument by Romania's Ministry of Culture and Religious Affairs.

See also 
 Romanian architecture

References

External links  

Houses in Bucharest
Historic monuments in Bucharest
Houses completed in 1883